The  Washington Redskins season was the franchise's 62nd season in the National Football League (NFL) and their 57th in Washington, D.C. The team failed to improve on their 9–7 record from 1992. Head coach Joe Gibbs retired following the 1992 season and the Redskins promoted his defensive coordinator, Richie Petitbon, to be the head coach. The Redskins’ aging core struggled with injuries while numerous key players (Gary Clark, Wilber Marshall, Martin Mayhew, Jumpy Geathers, and Fred Stokes) left the team via free agency.  Management tried to ease the losses by signing players like Carl Banks, Tim McGee, Al Noga, and Rick Graf, but none had a major impact on the team.  The team finished the season with a 4–12 record and missed the playoffs for the first time since 1989. Petitbon was fired at the end of the season.

The Redskins were swept by the Cardinals for the first time since 1974, losing to the Cardinals at RFK Stadium for the first time since 1978.

It was the only season in Redskins history where no player was selected to the Pro Bowl.

Offseason

Draft

Roster

Schedule

Note: Intra-division opponents are in bold text.

Standings

References

Washington
Washington Redskins seasons
Red